Horse Guards Parade is a large parade ground off Whitehall in central London (at grid reference ). It is the site of the annual ceremonies of Trooping the Colour, which commemorates the monarch's official birthday, and the Beating Retreat.

History

Horse Guards Parade was formerly the site of the Palace of Whitehall's tiltyard, where tournaments (including jousting) were held in the time of Henry VIII. It was also the scene of annual celebrations of the birthday of Queen Elizabeth I. The area has been used for a variety of reviews, parades and other ceremonies since the 17th century.

The adjacent Horse Guards building was once the Headquarters of the British Army. The Duke of Wellington was based in Horse Guards when he was Commander-in-Chief of the British Army. The current General Officer Commanding London District still occupies the same office and uses the same desk. Wellington also had living quarters within the building, which today are used as offices.

Car park usage

For much of the late 20th century, Horse Guards Parade was used as a car park for senior civil servants; about 500 were granted the privilege, which was known as the 'Great Perk'. The PIRA's mortar attack on 10 Downing Street on 7 February 1991, which was carried out from a vehicle parked in Horse Guards Avenue nearby, narrowly missed causing casualties and led to concerns. In April 1993 the Royal Parks Review Group, headed by Dame Jennifer Jenkins (later Baroness Jenkins) recommended that the parade should be restored for public use, and linked to St James's Park by closing Horse Guards Road. The proposal was taken up by the Department of National Heritage but then resisted by senior Cabinet members, apparently under pressure from the civil servants who were to lose their parking places.

Public revelation of the resistance led to considerable criticism by Simon Jenkins, a newspaper columnist, who pressured Sir Robin Butler, Head of the Home Civil Service, to end general usage as parking as part of a wider programme of reforms. In late 1996 Horse Guards Parade was cleared, for repairs, and in March 1997 it was announced that parking was banned.

Layout
The parade ground is open on the west side, where it faces Horse Guards Road and St James's Park. It is enclosed to the north by the Admiralty Citadel and the Admiralty Extension building, to the east by Admiralty House, William Kent's Horse Guards (formerly the headquarters of the British Army) and the rear of Dover House (home of the Scotland Office), and to the south by Kent's Treasury building (now used by the Cabinet Office), garden walls of 10 Downing Street (the official residence and office of the British Prime Minister) and Mountbatten Green before the Foreign and Commonwealth Office's west wing. Access to the south side is restricted for national security.

On the east side, Horse Guards Parade is normally accessible to the public from Whitehall through the arches of Horse Guards.

Monuments

A number of military monuments and trophies ring the outside of the parade ground, including:

 To the west, beside St James's Park, the Guards Memorial, designed by the sculptor Gilbert Ledward in 1923–26 and erected to commemorate the First Battle of Ypres and other battles of World War I.
 To the north, the Royal Naval Division War Memorial, designed by Sir Edwin Lutyens in 1925, removed before the Second World War, and returned to its original site beside the Admiralty Extension building and rededicated on "Beaucourt Day" (13 November 2003).
 To the east:
Equestrian statues of Field Marshals Roberts and Wolseley (see Equestrian statue of the Earl Roberts, London and Equestrian statue of the Viscount Wolseley).
 A Turkish cannon made in 1524 "by Murad son of Abdullah, chief gunner" which was captured in Egypt in 1801.
 The Cádiz Memorial, a French mortar mounted on a brass monster which commemorates the lifting of the siege of Cádiz in Spain in 1812.
 To the south, statues of Field Marshal Kitchener and of Admiral of the Fleet Mountbatten (see Statue of the Earl Kitchener, London and Statue of the Earl Mountbatten, London).

An oddity is the black background to the number 2 of the double sided clock which overlooks the Parade Ground and the front entrance, it is popularly thought to commemorate the time the last absolute monarch of England, Charles I, was beheaded at the Banqueting House opposite.

Sporting and public events

2012 Summer Olympics

Horse Guards Parade hosted beach volleyball at the 2012 Summer Olympics held in London. Temporary courts and seating designed by Populous were installed by the Arena Group, much as seating is installed annually for Trooping the Colour. There was one court with a capacity of 15,000 with two tiers and a floodlight tower at each of its four corners, two practice courts to the east of the arena, and a further six practice courts at St. James's Park.  Most matches were played on Centre Court, but some matches were played on Court 1 on day 6 of the competition.

London Polo Championships
Horse Guards Parade hosted the 1st London Polo Championships on 17 and 18 June 2009 with teams from around the world.

Sainsburys Anniversary Games 2014
On Sunday 20 July 2014, a temporary arena played host to the anniversary games.

References

External links
 

17th-century establishments in England
Event venues established in the 17th century
Squares in the City of Westminster
Parks and open spaces in the City of Westminster
Sports venues in London
Equestrian venues
Venues of the 2012 Summer Olympics
Olympic volleyball venues
Parade grounds
Beach volleyball venues